Super Bowl XLII was an American football game between the National Football Conference (NFC) champion underdog New York Giants and the American Football Conference (AFC) champion undefeated New England Patriots to decide the National Football League (NFL) champion for the 2007 season. The Giants defeated the Patriots by the score of 17–14 with the now well known "Helmet Catch" often being considered the best Super Bowl catch of all time. Many also consider this game the biggest upset of all time. The game was played on February 3, 2008, at the University of Phoenix Stadium in Glendale, Arizona.

The game is regarded as one of the biggest upsets in the history of professional sports, as well as one of the greatest Super Bowl games ever. The Patriots entered the game as 12-point favorites after becoming the first team to complete a perfect regular season since the 1972 Miami Dolphins, and the only one since the league expanded to a 16-game regular season schedule in 1978. The Giants, who finished the regular season with a 10–6 record, were seeking to become the first NFC wild card team to win a Super Bowl, and were also looking for their third Super Bowl victory and first since they won Super Bowl XXV seventeen years earlier. This Super Bowl was also a rematch of the final game of the regular season, in which New England won, 38–35.

In the fourth quarter, down 14–10, the Giants started their game-winning drive on their own 17-yard line with 2:39 left. In the drive's most memorable play, David Tyree made the "Helmet Catch" on 3rd down, a leaping one-handed catch pinning the football with his right hand to the crown of his helmet for a 32-yard first down conversion. After a second first-down conversion by Steve Smith on 3rd and 11, wide receiver Plaxico Burress scored the winning touchdown on a 13-yard reception with 35 seconds remaining. The Giants' game winning-drive is often regarded as the greatest in NFL history.

The game was tight throughout, with both teams' defense dominating the competition until near the end of the game. The game featured five lead changes (New York took it three times and New England twice). Only 10 total points were scored in the first three quarters. The Giants consumed a Super Bowl-record 9 minutes and 59 seconds on their opening drive, but could only manage a field goal. The Patriots then responded with running back Laurence Maroney's 1-yard touchdown run on the first play of the second quarter. After a scoreless third quarter, the fourth quarter saw a Super Bowl-record three lead changes. After Tyree's 3-yard touchdown reception at the beginning of the quarter, New England wide receiver Randy Moss made a 6-yard touchdown reception with 2:42 left to play before New York's game-winning drive. Giants quarterback Eli Manning, who completed 19 of 34 passes for 255 yards and two touchdowns, with one interception, was named Super Bowl MVP. Giants defensive end Michael Strahan, who retired following the victory, had two tackles and one sack. This game was the first since Super Bowl IX in 1975 (in which the Pittsburgh Steelers defeated the Minnesota Vikings 16–6) that neither team scored at least 20 points. This game was also the first Super Bowl game with three fourth-quarter lead changes, and the only one to date.

Super Bowl XLII was ranked fifth on NFL.com's 100 Greatest Games, the highest ranked Super Bowl game, while Tyree's catch was ranked third on NFL.com's 100 Greatest Plays. Many other media outlets rank Super Bowl XLII as the greatest Super Bowl ever. Many sports websites consider it not only as one of the most iconic moments of the 2000s in regards to sports, but as one of the most iconic sports moments.

The telecast of the game on Fox broke the then-record for the most watched Super Bowl in history with an average of 97.5 million viewers in the United States.

Background

Host selection process
As always, the league considered several potential host cities before choosing the Phoenix area. In this case, the process drew special interest because the league considered holding Super Bowl XLII in New York City or Washington, D.C. as a symbol of the recovery from the September 11 attacks. New York City's bid did not go far. Aside from the obvious climatic concerns, it was also difficult to find a suitable stadium. Proposed renovations to the 1970s-vintage Giants Stadium were still being disputed amongst the various parties. Giants Stadium also lacked a roof, as did both of New York City's baseball stadiums, and the NFL had never played an outdoor Super Bowl in a cold weather climate. The city of New York and the New York Jets failed to secure a deal to build a new West Side Stadium (which, according to the initial plans, would have been built with a roof).  During the years since the Super Bowl XLII bid fell through, Giants Stadium has been demolished. Its replacement, MetLife Stadium, was awarded Super Bowl XLVIII.

Washington, D.C.'s bid proved to be more viable as the D.C. area had a relatively new (albeit roofless) stadium in FedExField. DC's winter weather, although still potentially problematic, is milder than New York's climate.

In the end, the process boiled down to three finalists: Washington, D.C., Phoenix and Tampa. NFL owners finally chose University of Phoenix Stadium in Glendale, Arizona as the site for Super Bowl XLII during their October 30, 2003 meeting in Chicago. In subsequent years, Raymond James Stadium in Tampa was chosen as the site for Super Bowl XLIII and the proposed (but never built) West Side Stadium was briefly designated as the venue for Super Bowl XLIV. However, this game was later moved to Sun Life Stadium in Miami Gardens, Florida, when it became clear that the new stadium in New York City would not be built in time for the February 2010 game.

Venue

The kickoff for the game took place at 4:32 p.m. MST (23:32 UTC). This was the first Super Bowl played on a retractable natural-grass field surface; the University of Phoenix Stadium's removable surface is unique among American sports venues.

Super Bowl XLII was also the second Super Bowl played in a retractable-roof stadium (the first was played at Reliant Stadium in Houston for Super Bowl XXXVIII). During the regular season, the home team decides 90 minutes before kickoff whether the roof will be open or closed, and an open roof must remain open unless weather conditions get worse. However, as a neutral site, the NFL controls the option to open or close without any restrictions. The first time this was employed was in Super Bowl XXXVIII at Reliant Stadium; the roof was open for pregame and halftime shows and closed during the game. Because there was rain in the forecast for Super Bowl XLII, the roof was closed for the entire day's activities.

During a February 6, 2007 ceremony with Arizona Governor Janet Napolitano, the NFL and the Arizona Super Bowl Host Committee unveiled the slogan "Who Wants It More?" along with its mascot "Spike the Super Ball" (an anthropomorphized football with sunglasses and sneakers) and a large "Super Bowl XLII Countdown Clock" at Phoenix Sky Harbor International Airport. The Super Bowl XLII logo was also unveiled. It features the shape of the state of Arizona in red and two horizontal white stripes in the middle to represent the vertical lines on University of Phoenix Stadium. The turquoise Roman numerals represent the Native American culture of Arizona. The red star represents the AFC and the blue star represents the NFC. This was also the last Super Bowl with the league's previous logo painted at midfield; the following season, the league redesigned its primary logo.

Teams

New York Giants

The New York Giants began the season with low expectations after star running back Tiki Barber retired. The Giants had lost in the NFC Wild Card round in each of the previous two seasons and had not won a playoff game in seven years. Quarterback Eli Manning, the younger brother of Super Bowl XLI MVP quarterback Peyton Manning, had struggled to find consistency. In his three seasons as a starter, he had completed less than 54% of his passes with a career passer rating of 73.4. While generally regarded as a solid quarterback, Manning had been unable to achieve the same level of success as fellow 2004 draftees Philip Rivers (for whom he was traded) and Ben Roethlisberger, the latter of whom had already won a Super Bowl (Super Bowl XL). By the 2007 season, many sports writers were starting to question if Eli would ever live up to the expectations that accompanied being selected with the first overall pick in a draft.

The criticism of Manning intensified as the Giants lost the first two games of the regular season. The Giants recovered, though, notching six consecutive wins and finishing the year with a 10–6 record. The Giants were able to secure a wild card bid in the playoffs, despite the loss of running back Derrick Ward, defensive end Mathias Kiwanuka, and four-time Pro Bowl tight end Jeremy Shockey to injury. In the final game of the regular season, the Giants played at home against the undefeated New England Patriots. Although the Giants had already earned a playoff spot and had nothing to gain by winning the game, coach Tom Coughlin decided to play his starters throughout the game. New York, clearly playing to win against the league's best team, narrowly lost 38–35. But the effort seemed to rejuvenate the Giants and prepare them for a difficult playoff run. Manning led his team to three road playoff wins in Tampa, Dallas and Green Bay respectively, without throwing a single interception. The Giants' three playoff wins gave them an NFL record 10 consecutive wins on the road. They finished the season with a franchise-low 77 penalties, after setting a franchise record two years before with 146.

Manning finished the 2007 season with 3,336 yards, 23 touchdowns, and 20 interceptions. His primary target, Plaxico Burress, caught 70 passes for 1,050 yards and 12 touchdowns. Amani Toomer, the Giants all-time leading receiver and one of only two players remaining from their last Super Bowl appearance in Super Bowl XXXV, was also a reliable target with 59 receptions for 760 yards, while Shockey contributed 57 receptions for 619 yards and 3 touchdowns before suffering a season-ending injury in week 15. The Giants' ground game was led by running back Brandon Jacobs, who at 6'4" (193 cm) and 264 pounds (118 kg), was one of the largest starting halfbacks in the NFL. He finished the season with 1,009 yards and an average of five yards per carry, while also catching 23 passes despite starting only nine games.  Running back Reuben Droughns rushed for 276 yards and team-leading 6 touchdowns, while also catching 7 passes for 49 yards and returning 21 kickoffs for 437 yards.  Rookie running back Ahmad Bradshaw added 38 kickoff returns for 921 yards, while also rushing for 190.

The Giants had a defensive line that was led by defensive ends Osi Umenyiora (the lone Pro Bowl representative on the team, the fewest a Super Bowl team has ever had), Michael Strahan, and Justin Tuck. Umenyiora led the defense with 13 sacks and five forced fumbles. Strahan, another veteran from the Giants' last Super Bowl appearance in 2000, had nine sacks, giving him a career total of 141.5 and breaking the franchise record held by Lawrence Taylor. Tuck recorded ten sacks and 48 solo tackles. In the secondary, cornerback Sam Madison and safety Gibril Wilson led the team with four interceptions each. Cornerback R. W. McQuarters had no interceptions during the season, but played effectively in the playoffs, with interceptions in each of the Giants first three postseason games. Punter Jeff Feagles played in his first Super Bowl after 20 years in the NFL. This was also the last game for Giants athletic trainer John Johnson who had been with the team for 60 years.

The Giants became only the fourth team to win the Super Bowl without playing a single home game in the preceding playoffs. They joined the 1966 Green Bay Packers (who won Super Bowl I against the Kansas City Chiefs), the 1969 Kansas City Chiefs (who won Super Bowl IV against the Minnesota Vikings) and the 2005 Pittsburgh Steelers (who won Super Bowl XL against the Seattle Seahawks) in accomplishing this feat. However, Green Bay had to win two games (including the Super Bowl), Kansas City three, and Pittsburgh and the Giants four, in order to accomplish this. Since then, the 2010 Green Bay Packers also won three road playoff games en route to their Super Bowl XLV victory over the Pittsburgh Steelers.

The Giants were the only NFC team to make multiple Super Bowl appearances in the 2000s decade, at the ends of the 2000 and 2007 seasons. Starting with the Rams' appearance in 2001, ten different NFC teams represented the conference from 2001 to 2010: Rams, Buccaneers, Panthers, Eagles, Seahawks, Bears, Giants, Cardinals, Saints, and Packers.

New England Patriots

When the New England Patriots arrived at Super Bowl XLII, they were already billed as the greatest team in NFL history. The Patriots were not only competing for a fourth Super Bowl title since the 2001 season; they were aiming to become the first team in NFL history to achieve a 19–0 record. Their perfect 16–0 record in the regular season was the first since the league moved to a 16-game regular season in 1978.  It was also only the fourth undefeated and untied regular season in NFL history.  New England set NFL records with 589 points scored (an average of 36.8 points per game) (since broken by the 2013 Broncos), 75 total touchdowns, and a net differential of +315 points (they gave up 274 points, fourth best in the league). Some experts have suggested that the Patriots' 16–0 record is the culmination of a larger trend towards better records for top NFL teams since the league realignment in 2002.

The team was led by then eighth-year quarterback Tom Brady who proceeded to have the best season of his entire career and won his first NFL MVP and NFL Offensive MVP awards, throwing for a then-career-high 4,806 yards and a then NFL record 50 touchdowns (22 more than his previous best season; since broken by Peyton Manning in 2013), and just eight interceptions. His passer rating of 117.2 was the second-highest season rating in NFL history. One often-cited reason for Brady's improved numbers was the acquisition of receivers Randy Moss and Wes Welker. The Patriots acquired Moss, a nine-year veteran, from the Oakland Raiders for a fourth-round pick in the 2007 NFL Draft after Moss had, statistically, the worst year of his career (with 42 receptions for 553 yards and three touchdowns). With the Patriots, though, Moss caught 98 receptions for 1,493 yards and an NFL record 23 touchdowns, and was selected a first-team All Pro. The Patriots also gave the Miami Dolphins second- and seventh-round picks for Welker. Welker tied for the league lead with 112 receptions for 1,175 yards and 8 touchdowns, while also returning 25 punts for 249 yards and 7 kickoffs for 176, earning himself second-team All Pro selection.  Welker and Moss both earned votes for Offensive Player of the Year. Other major contributors to the Patriots' passing game included Donté Stallworth, who added 697 yards and three touchdowns, and tight end Benjamin Watson, whose 36 receptions totaled 389 yards and six touchdowns.

Running back Laurence Maroney was the Patriots' top rusher with 835 yards and six touchdowns, while Sammy Morris added 385 yards and three touchdowns (Morris ended up on injured reserve midway through the season, and thus could not play in the Super Bowl). Longtime Patriot Kevin Faulk had 265 yards and was also a reliable receiver out of the backfield, catching 47 passes for 383 yards and a touchdown. The Patriots offensive line featured three players selected to the Pro Bowl, guard Logan Mankins, tackle Matt Light, and center Dan Koppen.
 
The Patriots defensive line was led by nose tackle Vince Wilfork, who was selected to his first Pro Bowl; he was also fined four times during the season for unnecessary roughness.  The Patriots had a set of veteran linebackers who had a combined 16 Pro Bowl selections. Outside linebacker Mike Vrabel had, statistically, the best season of his career. He led the team in sacks with a career-high 12.5, while also forcing five fumbles and earning his first Pro Bowl selection. Adalius Thomas, an off-season signing from the Ravens, recorded six sacks. Junior Seau, who had been selected to the Pro Bowl 12 times during his career but had never won a Super Bowl, returned for his 18th season and got 74 tackles with 3.5 sacks. Tedy Bruschi recorded 92 tackles and two sacks. The Patriots secondary featured another player selected to the Pro Bowl, cornerback Asante Samuel, who led the team with six interceptions.  Defensive back Ellis Hobbs returned 35 kickoffs for 911 yards and a touchdown, ranking him 7th in the NFL with a 26.0 yards per return average.

Playoffs

The Giants became the first NFC team (third overall) to advance to the Super Bowl by winning three playoff games on the road. After beating the fourth-seeded Tampa Bay Buccaneers 24–14, the Giants upset the top-seeded Dallas Cowboys 21–17, when R. W. McQuarters intercepted a pass from Cowboys quarterback Tony Romo in the end zone as time expired. The Giants advanced to the Super Bowl with a 23–20 overtime win over the second-seeded Green Bay Packers in the NFC Championship Game, which was the third coldest game in NFL history (−1 °F at kickoff, −24 °F wind chill) with an interception by Corey Webster that set up Lawrence Tynes's game-winning 47-yard field goal. The field goal was the longest by a visiting kicker in Lambeau Field postseason history. This turned out to be the final game Brett Favre played for the Packers.

Meanwhile, the Patriots continued to set NFL records on their road to the Super Bowl. First, Brady set the NFL record for completion percentage in a single game (92.9%) with 26 of 28 completions for 268 yards and three touchdowns in their 31–20 win over the Jacksonville Jaguars in the divisional round, while safety Rodney Harrison tied an NFL record by recording an interception in his fourth consecutive postseason game. One week later, the Patriots defeated the San Diego Chargers 21–12 in the AFC Championship Game. Although Brady threw three interceptions in the game, the Patriots defense forced two turnovers and limited the Chargers to four field goals, while Maroney rushed for 122 yards and a touchdown for the second game in a row.

Pre-game notes

New England was heavily favored to win the game and become the first NFL team to go through a 16-game regular season and postseason undefeated.  Had the Patriots won, they would also have joined the 1972 Miami Dolphins as the only teams ever to win the NFL league championship with an undefeated and untied record.  However, others predicted that the Giants could accomplish a win. New York's record of 10 consecutive road wins included five teams favored to beat them. The Giants achieved playoff victories against the Cowboys (who had defeated New York twice in the regular season) and Packers (who had beaten the Giants in week 2).

The Patriots and Giants had played against each other in the last week of the regular season.  Technically, the game had little significance, since both teams had already clinched their respective spots in the playoffs.  But due to the Patriots' quest for an undefeated season, this game was one of the most heavily watched games in league history. NFL Network was originally scheduled to air the game as part of their Saturday Night Football coverage, with WCVB and WWOR carrying the game locally in Boston and New York. Shortly before the game was scheduled to air, CBS and NBC bought broadcast rights to the game and NFL Network's broadcast was carried by both networks, marking the first time in NFL history that an NFL game was carried on three broadcast networks at the same time.  The game was also the first NFL game to be simulcast on a national level since Super Bowl I.  As they were favored to do, the Patriots won the game to finish the regular season undefeated. Still, the game was close and competitive, with both teams playing their starters for all 60 minutes. New England won, 38–35, by overcoming a 12-point deficit in the third quarter, the largest deficit the Patriots had faced all season. "There is nothing but positives", Giants coach Tom Coughlin said after the game. "I told the players in playing this game everything would be positives, there would be no negatives and that is how I feel. I don't know any better way to be prepared for the playoffs than to go against a team that was 15–0."

This would be the third time in the Giants' four Super Bowl appearances in which the team played its eventual AFC opponent during that year's regular season. Both of the prior occasions saw the Giants beat those opponents in the Super Bowl (defeating Denver in Super Bowl XXI and Buffalo in Super Bowl XXV).

For the third consecutive year, the arrival dates for the teams were staggered, with the Patriots arriving on Sunday, January 27 (corresponding to the traditional day that teams arrive for the game with the two-week break) and the Giants waiting to arrive until Monday, January 28. A report filed by ESPN's Rachel Nichols suggested that the Giants stayed to practice more of their game plan in their home facility before arriving at the Super Bowl. By electing to stay back at home the Giants chose to follow a tactic that the previous two Super Bowl champions, the Indianapolis Colts (before Super Bowl XLI) and the Pittsburgh Steelers (before Super Bowl XL), had employed.

The Patriots practiced at Sun Devil Stadium on the campus of Arizona State University, while the Giants practiced at the Arizona Cardinals' practice facility, both of which are located in Tempe.

As the designated home team in the annual rotation between AFC and NFC teams, the Patriots elected to wear their home navy uniforms with silver pants, while the Giants wore their road white uniforms with grey pants.

Broadcasting

Broadcasting

United States
Fox broadcast Super Bowl XLII as part of an annual cycle between the three main broadcast television partners of the NFL. Joe Buck and Troy Aikman called the game, while Pam Oliver and Chris Myers were the sideline reporters. Fox aired nine hours of pre-game programming, which began with a special episode of Fox News Sunday, as well as a two-hour special (Fox Super Sunday) hosted by Fox News Channel anchor Shepard Smith, which previewed the Super Tuesday primaries for the 2008 presidential election. The Fox NFL Sunday panel hosted the main pre-game show, led by Curt Menefee, joined by Terry Bradshaw, Howie Long, and Jimmy Johnson. Jillian Reynolds served as Weather and entertainment reporter, Frank Caliendo appeared in various comedic skits (including one where he portrayed John Madden and correctly predicted that the Giants would win) and American Idol host Ryan Seacrest provided coverage of celebrity arrivals to the game site. A Spanish language broadcast was aired on the second audio program with John Laguna as play-by-play announcer and Pepe Mantilla as color analyst.

The telecast was the most watched Super Bowl in history with an average of 97.5 million viewers in the United States. These numbers were later surpassed by several subsequent games, including 2015's Super Bowl XLIX (which was also hosted by Glendale), which now holds the record with an average of 114 million viewers. The Super Bowl XLII broadcast achieved the highest Nielsen ratings (43.3) for the game since Super Bowl XXXIV. At the time, it was also the second most watched TV program of all time in the United States.

Commercials
Fox took in at least $250 million in revenue from commercial time sold for the game.
One of 63 thirty-second spots among thirty-seven different advertisers cost an estimated $2.7 million (excluding production costs), up from $2.6 million in 2007. However, advertisers are usually offered discounted rates below the official one.

As Super Bowl XLII fell only two days before Super Tuesday, critics and politicians foresaw the possibility that presidential candidates could attempt to buy time during the Super Bowl. However, Fox stated that it would not accept such ads, citing both equal time regulations (the FCC has additionally ruled that, despite requirements for all broadcasters to provide "reasonable" access to commercial inventory for candidates before an election or primary, candidates cannot reasonably expect to receive ad time during high-profile programs of this nature), and the fact that all of the spots had already been sold out by January 2008. However, the campaign of Democratic candidate Barack Obama did purchase local ad time in some markets.

The rock band Eels announced an intent to broadcast a one-second spot during the game (consisting solely of lead singer Mark Oliver Everett saying the letter "U") to promote its compilation album "Useless Trinkets", but later announced that it had backtracked after having learned it could only purchase commercial time in 30-second blocks (and a proposal to recruit 29 other advertisers to air their own one-second ads alongside them could be harmful to viewers with photosensitive epilepsy).

International
Outside North America, Super Bowl XLII was distributed by the NFL and NFL International. Overall, the game was available to an estimated potential audience of one billion viewers within 223 countries and territories. However, viewing figures outside North America rose only marginally on previous years with an estimated 10 million people tuning in from outside the USA, Canada and Mexico for an overall global audience in the region of 114 million. Dick Stockton and Sterling Sharpe were the announcers for the International broadcast.

United Kingdom
The BBC acquired the rights in the United Kingdom. The game aired live on BBC Two, carrying the NFL International feed, ending ITV Sport's coverage, which began in 2005. The game was also subsequently available on the BBC's on demand service, iPlayer. Sky Sports broadcast the game in both standard and high definition using Fox's feed and announcers.

Internet broadcast streams
Independent Phoenix television station KTVK broadcast a live video stream from a Webcam located outside of the University of Phoenix Stadium. The camera provided millions of Internet users from around the world a chance to peer in on pre- and post-game activities, watching thousands of spectators file into and out of the stadium on Sunday, February 3. The Stadium Cam broadcast from Friday, February 1 to Monday, February 4, 2008 on the station's website.

NFL.com's "NFL.com/live" carried its own coverage of Super Bowl events leading up to and after the game, mostly simulcasting NFL Network.

Radio
On radio, Westwood One had the national broadcast rights to the game in the United States and Canada; Marv Albert and Boomer Esiason served as the announcing team for that network. The game was carried on BBC Radio 5 Live in the United Kingdom with Arlo White commentating.

Sirius Satellite Radio carried twelve feeds in eight languages in the United States. The following language feeds were offered:

Westwood One (American English)
Univision Radio/United Stations (Mexican Spanish, U.S.)
New England Patriots Radio Network
New York Giants Radio Network
BBC Radio 5 Live (British English)
NHK Japan (Japanese)
NTV Plus (Russian)
SMG (Mandarin Chinese)

FieldPass, the subscription Internet radio service provided by the league at NFL.com, carried most of these feeds, with select international feeds for free.

Locally, Gil Santos and Gino Cappelletti called the game for the Patriots on WBCN radio, and Bob Papa, Dick Lynch, and Carl Banks called the Giants' radio broadcast on WFAN-AM. By NFL rules, only WBCN, WFAN, Sirius and FieldPass carried the teams' local broadcasts, and affiliate stations instead carried the Westwood One feed. WBCN, WFAN, and Westwood One are all owned by CBS Radio.

DVD
The official DVD of the Super Bowl was released on February 26, 2008. The DVD covered the entire 2007 New York Giants season, as well as special features including the NFL Network post game commentary, the halftime show in its entirety, the Media Day highlights, the NFC Divisional Game and NFC Championship Game highlights, profiles on Mathias Kiwanuka and Tom Coughlin, and features on Eli Manning and Michael Strahan. The New York Giants: Road to Super Bowl XLII was released on June 3, 2008. It was a 5 disc set that featured the full broadcasts of the last game of the regular season and all four playoff games. On August 26, 2009 New York Giants 10 Greatest Games was released, in which Super Bowl XLII was included as well.

Entertainment

Pre-game ceremonies
Willie Nelson performed at an NFL-sponsored pre-game tailgate party, singing a duet with Sara Evans of his song "Mammas Don't Let Your Babies Grow Up to Be Cowboys" as part of Fox's pre-game show.

This year's Super Bowl entertainment had many connections to Fox's series American Idol. On August 16, both the NFL and Fox confirmed that Idol host Seacrest would serve as emcee for the pre-game show, with Alicia Keys as the primary performer; as she sang a medley of her songs, including "Go Ahead", "Fallin'", "If I Ain't Got You", "Teenage Love Affair", and "No One" as the final performance. Idol Season Six winner Jordin Sparks, herself a native of Glendale and daughter of former New York Giants cornerback Phillippi Sparks, performed the National Anthem, while Phoenix College professor and theatrical interpreter A Dreamer interpreted it into American Sign Language. The anthem was followed by a flyover from the U.S. Navy precision flying team, the Blue Angels. In addition, judge Paula Abdul premiered her first music video in over a decade, "Dance Like There's No Tomorrow", which she made with fellow judge Randy Jackson as part of Fox's pregame coverage to kick off her official comeback.

The coin toss ceremony posthumously honored Pro Football Hall of Fame head coach Bill Walsh, who died on July 30, 2007. His former players Ronnie Lott, Jerry Rice and Steve Young joined Walsh's children, Craig and Elizabeth, at the ceremony.

Halftime

As is always the case, several big names were mentioned as possible performers for the halftime show before a final choice (Tom Petty and the Heartbreakers) was announced. The halftime entertainer selection process in late 2007 was not unusual: however, since the site selection process four years earlier was of special interest, it is necessary to also mention some of the acts who might have performed, but did not do so.

According to the entertainment publication Variety, a wish list of potential halftime performers was developed by the NFL. Among those on the wish list were Bruce Springsteen (who performed during halftime at Super Bowl XLIII the following year), Norah Jones and the Eagles. In addition, interest in the slot was expressed by Bon Jovi, who had planned to open the U.S. leg of their Lost Highway Tour with a performance during the halftime show.

According to Rolling Stone, the engagement was actually offered to the Eagles by the NFL, but the offer was turned down.

Then, on December 2, 2007, it was officially announced that the halftime entertainment would be provided by Tom Petty and the Heartbreakers. The songs "American Girl", "I Won't Back Down", "Free Fallin'", and "Runnin' Down a Dream" were performed by the band to kick off their 2008 world tour. Bridgestone served as the halftime show sponsor. The halftime show itself, produced by Don Mischer and White Cherry Entertainment in association with NFL Network, was nominated for an Emmy Award in 2009.

Post-game ceremonies

Former Redskins quarterback Doug Williams, MVP in Super Bowl XXII, commemorating the twentieth anniversary of becoming the first African American quarterback to lead a team to victory in the Super Bowl, took part in the Vince Lombardi Trophy presentation ceremony after the game.

Eli Manning was awarded the Pete Rozelle Trophy for being named MVP, and also received the keys to a 2009 Cadillac Escalade hybrid SUV. Though not the only brothers to play in a Super Bowl, Eli Manning and Peyton Manning (Super Bowl XLI) are the first brothers to be named Super Bowl MVPs (doing so in successive years).

After the game, New York City erupted in celebration, with the sounds of cheers and honking horns echoing through city streets. Crowds of elated New Yorkers, surprised by their team's unexpected victory, packed Second Avenue in Manhattan, stalling traffic around the borough. Times Square was swarmed with celebrating Giants fans well past midnight; similar celebrations arose throughout Brooklyn, Queens, The Bronx, Staten Island, Long Island, Westchester County, Fairfield County, and North Jersey, where the Giants play their home games.

New York Mayor Michael Bloomberg, witnessing the first New York sports team championship victory as mayor, praised the hometown team's upset victory, saying; "New York has come back many times in the past, and Big Blue proved tonight that you should never, ever, count us out." Many New Yorkers polled the Giants' win to be among the most satisfying championship victories in New York sports history. There were also a series of firsts with the championship, not just for the Giants, but also for the city of New York and the New York metropolitan area. Those firsts were:

Giants:
Super Bowl championship since Super Bowl XXV in 1991.
City of New York:
Super Bowl championship since the Giants won Super Bowl XXV in 1991.
Major professional sports championship since:
The Yankees won the 2000 World Series.
This was also the first championship for a team other than the Yankees since the Rangers won the 1994 Stanley Cup.
New York Metropolitan area:
Super Bowl championship since the Giants win in 1991.

On the following Tuesday, February 5, New York City hosted for the Giants a ticker tape parade up Broadway in Lower Manhattan. It was the first along the famed "Canyon of Heroes" since the New York Yankees won the 2000 World Series, and the Giants' first parade in New York. (Because of acrimonious relations at that time between New York City and the state of New Jersey, the team chose not to participate in a Manhattan parade for its Super Bowl XXI championship in 1987, but instead held a "Victory Rally" at Giants Stadium in The Meadowlands. After their Super Bowl XXV championship in 1991, then-owner Wellington Mara chose not to hold any celebrations due to the Gulf War.)  After six years in office, Bloomberg became the 14th consecutive mayor of New York City to preside over a ticker-tape parade. (In contrast, his predecessor, Rudy Giuliani presided over his first ticker-tape parade just five months after becoming mayor, after the Rangers won the Stanley Cup) Also attending were New York Governor Eliot Spitzer and Senator Chuck Schumer. Spitzer also announced the availability of a New York Giants Super Bowl XLII Champions custom license plate and issued a proclamation declaring the day "New York Giants Super Bowl Champions Day" throughout the state of New York.

Following the parade, the Giants held two victory rallies: one at New York's City Hall and another one two hours later at Giants Stadium in the New Jersey Meadowlands.

Game summary

After scoring a combined 73 points in their regular season meeting, the teams scored a mere 10 points by the end of the third quarter, with the Patriots leading 7–3. The Patriots' record-setting offense gave up five sacks and one lost fumble, while the Giants' offense managed only five first downs in the second and third quarters. Yet in the fourth quarter, quarterback Eli Manning threw two touchdown passes, including the winning drive that culminated with a 13-yard touchdown pass to Plaxico Burress with 35 seconds remaining.

First quarter

After calling tails to win the coin toss, the Giants started the game with the longest drive in Super Bowl history, a 16-play, 63-yard march that consumed 9 minutes, 59 seconds, breaking the previous record of 9 minutes, 29 seconds also set by the Giants in Super Bowl XXV, and featured four third-down conversions, the most ever on a Super Bowl opening drive. But New England halted the drive at their own 14-yard line, forcing the Giants to settle for a 32-yard field goal from Lawrence Tynes that gave New York a 3–0 lead.

New England then responded with its own scoring drive, as Laurence Maroney returned the kickoff 43 yards to the Patriots' 44-yard line, after which he rushed twice for 15 yards. Quarterback Tom Brady then completed three passes for 23 yards, but after two incomplete passes, New England was faced with 3rd-and-10 on the Giants' 17-yard line. However, on that play, New York linebacker Antonio Pierce committed pass interference by striking the helmet of tight end Benjamin Watson in the end zone, giving New England 1st-and-goal at the 1.

Second quarter
This set up a Maroney 1-yard touchdown run two plays later, the first play of the second quarter, giving the Patriots a 7–3 lead. The two teams each only had one drive in the entire opening quarter, a Super Bowl record. It was the first Super Bowl since Super Bowl XXXIII in which both teams scored on their initial possession of the game. On the Giants' first drive of the second quarter, on 3rd-and-7, wide receiver Amani Toomer caught in a deep pass from Manning along the left sideline while dragging his feet in-bounds for a 38-yard gain, moving the ball to the Patriots' 19-yard line. But three plays later, Manning threw a pass that bounced out of the arms of rookie wide receiver Steve Smith and into the hands of cornerback Ellis Hobbs for an interception.

The Patriots' ensuing drive resulted in a three-and-out as on 3rd-and-1 James Butler and Michael Strahan (who was playing in his final game) tackled Maroney for a two-yard loss and New England was forced to punt.

Then on the Giants' next drive, rookie running back Ahmad Bradshaw fumbled a hand-off from Manning and it looked as though Patriots' linebacker Pierre Woods had recovered the ball at the Giants' 30. But after the officials picked through the pile, it was determined that Bradshaw had made the recovery. The Giants maintained possession and wound up punting. New England's next drive ended with consecutive Giants' sacks, the first by linebacker Kawika Mitchell, the second by end Justin Tuck.

On the Giants' following drive, New York moved the ball to the New England 25, but linebacker Adalius Thomas sacked Manning and forced a fumble. Smith recovered the ball; however, Bradshaw was penalized for illegally batting the ball forward before the recovery. The penalty pushed the Giants out of field goal range, and following an incompletion, they were forced to punt.

After the punt, two 18-yard receptions by Moss and Donté Stallworth moved the ball to the Giants' 44. But with 22 seconds left before halftime, Brady fumbled while being sacked by Tuck and defensive end Osi Umenyiora recovered the ball. The game then went to halftime with the Patriots leading 7–3.

Third quarter

On the first drive of the second half, New England had a 4th-and-2 and chose to punt. However, after the play had been run, Patriots' head coach Bill Belichick challenged that New York had too many players on the field and replay confirmed that was the case as Giants linebacker Chase Blackburn was unable to get to the sidelines as the ball was being snapped. Therefore, referee Mike Carey reversed the play, and the Giants were penalized 5 yards for having too many players on the field, giving the Patriots a first down. The Patriots then drove to the Giants' 25, but Strahan sacked Brady for a 6-yard loss on third down. Then on 4th-and-13, with the ball on the Giants' 31, Belichick decided against a long field goal attempt by Stephen Gostkowski (which would have been a 49-yard attempt, near Gostkowski's season long of 50 yards) and tried to pick up a first down instead. Brady's pass to Jabar Gaffney was incomplete as it went out of the back of the end zone and the Giants took over on downs.

Fourth quarter

On the Giants' first drive of the fourth quarter, Manning completed a 45-yard pass to rookie tight end Kevin Boss. Following three runs by Bradshaw and a 17-yard reception by Smith on third down, Manning finished the 7-play, 80-yard drive with a 5-yard touchdown pass to usually unheralded wide receiver David Tyree, giving New York a 10–7 lead with 11:05 left in the game.

After consecutive three-and-outs by the Patriots and Giants, New England got the ball at its own 20 with 7:54 to play. Brady then completed a 5-yard pass to Wes Welker and a 10-yard pass to Moss, followed by a 9-yard run by Maroney to give the Patriots a first down at their own 44. Brady followed with a 13-yard pass to Welker, a four-yard completion to Kevin Faulk, and then a 10-yard pass to Welker for a first down at the Giants' 29. After that, Brady found Moss for an 11-yard completion and Faulk for a 12-yard completion and New England now had 1st-and-goal from the Giants' 6. Following two incomplete passes, New York cornerback Corey Webster slipped while backing into coverage, leaving Moss wide open in the end zone where Brady found him for a touchdown to give New England a 14–10 lead with 2:42 left in the game.

On the ensuing kickoff, Raymond Ventrone leveled Domenik Hixon after a 14-yard return, giving New York the ball on their own 17 with 2:39 left and all three timeouts remaining. Following two receptions by Toomer for 20 yards, Brandon Jacobs kept the drive going with a crucial 2-yard run off guard on 4th-and-1.  Manning picked up 5 yards with a scramble on the next play.  Then on 2nd-and-5, Manning’s pass was high and behind intended wide receiver David Tyree, but fell harmlessly out of bounds as New England cornerback Asante Samuel could not corral the pass for the potential game-winning interception. Play-by-play announcer Joe Buck was quick to note Manning’s visible frustration at the apparent miscommunication with Tyree on the play, which stopped the clock with 1:15 remaining. On the next play, 3rd-and-5 from the New York 44-yard line, Manning found himself in trouble as the Patriots' pass rush got to him quickly after the snap. He eluded Adalius Thomas, who missed Manning despite having the clearest shot at him, and then broke free from the grasp of Jarvis Green and Richard Seymour, both of whom had the quarterback by the jersey but failed to hold him in the grasp. In what is considered to be among the greatest Super Bowl plays of all time, Manning then re-oriented himself and launched the ball deep down the middle of the field, where both Tyree and Patriots safety Rodney Harrison were in position to make a play on the ball. Tyree outjumped multiple-time Pro Bowler Harrison to secure the ball, and maintained possession by pinning the ball against his helmet as he fell to the ground, clearly maintaining control for a gain of 32 yards and keeping the drive alive. Three plays later, on 3rd-and-11, Manning found a wide-open Steve Smith for a 12-yard gain to the New England 13, and Smith stepped out of bounds to stop the clock. On the next play, Patriots' cornerback Ellis Hobbs was beaten badly to the outside by the 6’6” Giants’ wide receiver Plaxico Burress on a "slant-and-go" route, allowing Manning more than enough room to find his big-bodied target for the touchdown. The score capped a 12-play, 83-yard drive to take the lead and prompted a roar from the fans in Glendale, then a mere 35 seconds from potentially witnessing the first 19–0 perfect season. Tynes’s extra point gave the Giants a 17–14 lead.

New England began its final possession on its own 26 with 29 seconds remaining and three timeouts, but the Giants defense did not allow a single yard. Following an errant pass attempt by Brady, Giants' rookie defensive tackle Jay Alford sacked Brady for a 10-yard loss.  The following play, a deep pass to Moss, was knocked away by cornerback Corey Webster, and Brady's 4th-and-20 Hail Mary pass in Moss's direction was batted down by safety Gibril Wilson, sealing the upset victory for New York. After the incompletion, it appeared that the officials would run out the clock, as it briefly read zero, before one second was re-added. Coaches, players, reporters, and fans crowded the field as if the game had ended. Belichick hugged Giants' head coach Tom Coughlin at midfield, then left for the locker room. This early departure was later criticized by some sportswriters, but other reporters defended Belichick by noting that he did not snub Coughlin (which would have been surprising anyway because the two coaches were friends from their days working together for Bill Parcells in the 1980s) and that the outcome of the game had been decided. The delay lasted 2 minutes 27 seconds before Manning kneeled out the final second and the Giants were officially crowned champions.

Box score

Statistical overview
Manning completed 19 of his 34 passes for 255 yards, including a mark of 9-of-14 for 152 yards and two touchdowns in the fourth quarter, with one interception, to be named the game's Most Valuable Player. Manning also became the first quarterback to throw two go-ahead touchdowns in the fourth quarter of a Super Bowl. Toomer was the Giants' leading receiver, with 6 catches for 84 yards, and Bradshaw and Jacobs rushed for 45 and 42 yards, respectively. Burress had only 2 receptions for 27 yards, but one of those was the game-winning touchdown with 35 seconds left. The Patriots' offense recorded 274 total yards to the Giants' 338. While he never scored, Welker tied a Super Bowl record with 11 receptions for 109 yards. Moss had five catches for 62 yards and a touchdown, and Maroney rushed for 36 yards and a TD. Brady completed 29 of his 48 passes for 266 yards and a touchdown. Brady's 29 completions gave him a career total of 100 in his four Super Bowls, surpassing the previous record for Super Bowl completions that was held by Joe Montana at 83.  Justin Tuck and Adalius Thomas were the top defensive performers for the Giants and Patriots, respectively, as each recorded five solo tackles, two sacks, and one forced fumble.

The game was the first Super Bowl in which neither team rushed for as many as 100 yards.

Records
The Giants became the first team to win a Super Bowl in 3 different decades (1986, 1990, 2007). The Giants set an NFL record with 11 consecutive road wins in a single season.  The Giants' matchup in Week 8 vs. the Miami Dolphins in London was an official Giants road game because it was originally scheduled to be played at Dolphin Stadium. The Giants were also officially classified as the "road" team for Super Bowl XLII based on the annual Super Bowl rotation where the NFC champions serve as the away team in even-numbered years, and as such, this was the Giants first championship game won on the road. Also note that the Week 5 game vs. the New York Jets was considered a "home" game for the Giants.

Patriots receiver Wes Welker tied the record for most catches in a Super Bowl, with 11.  Welker was the fourth player to record 11 receptions in a Super Bowl, following Dan Ross of the Cincinnati Bengals in Super Bowl XVI, Jerry Rice of the San Francisco 49ers in Super Bowl XXIII, and Deion Branch of the Patriots in Super Bowl XXXIX.

With his fourth quarter touchdown pass to Moss, Brady became just the fourth quarterback with a touchdown pass in four different Super Bowls, joining Roger Staubach, Joe Montana and Terry Bradshaw. He also became the sixth quarterback to start at least four Super Bowls, joining Montana, Bradshaw, Staubach, Jim Kelly and John Elway.

The Giants opening drive consumed 9 minutes and 59 seconds, making it the longest drive in Super Bowl history. The drive was 27 seconds longer than the previous record, which the Giants had set in winning Super Bowl XXV against the Buffalo Bills.

Due to the length of the Giants' opening drive (which itself contained a record 4 third-down conversions), the first quarter featured only two possessions, a record for an opening quarter.

The three lead changes in the fourth quarter were also a Super Bowl record.

Although not a record, the 17 points scored by the Giants was the fewest points for a Super Bowl victor since Super Bowl IX.

Final statistics
Sources: NFL.com Super Bowl XLII, Super Bowl XLII Play Finder NYG, Super Bowl XLII Play Finder NE

Statistical comparison

Individual leaders

1Completions/attempts
2Carries
3Long gain
4Receptions
5Times targeted

Starting lineups

Source:

Officials
Mike Carey was chosen to be the head referee for this game, marking the first time that an African American has been chosen to be the head official in a Super Bowl. Carey also officiated the last game between the Giants and Patriots. The full officiating crew was:

Referee: Mike Carey #94
Umpire: Tony Michalek #115
Head Linesman: Gary Slaughter #30
Line Judge: Carl Johnson #101
Field Judge: Boris Cheek #41
Side Judge: Larry Rose #128
Back Judge: Scott Helverson #93

Replay Official: Ken Baker
Video Operator: Jim Grant
Alternate Referee – Walt Coleman
Alternate Umpire – Dan Ferrell
Alternate Flank – Ed Camp
Alternate Deep – Carl Cheffers
Alternate Back Judge – Greg Steed

See also
Super Bowl XLVI – rematch of Super Bowl XLII
Super Bowl XLIX – the next Super Bowl to be held in that stadium (Patriots vs. Seattle Seahawks)

References

External links
 
 Official Super Bowl web site
 Official site of the Arizona Super Bowl Host Committee

2007 National Football League season
2008 in American football
2008 in American television
2008 in sports in Arizona
New England Patriots postseason
New York Giants postseason
Sports in Glendale, Arizona
Super Bowl 042
Tom Petty
Sports competitions in Maricopa County, Arizona
American football in Arizona
February 2008 sports events in the United States
Tom Brady
Events in Glendale, Arizona